Hanin may refer to:

 Hanin, one autonym for Koreans, an East Asian ethnic group
 Hanine, a village in southern Lebanon

People with the given name Hanin include:
 Hanin Elias (born 1972), German industrial/techno musician of Syrian descent
 Hanin Tamim (born 2000), Lebanese footballer
 Haneen Zoabi (also spelled Hanin Zoabi; born 1969), Israeli Arab politician

People with the surname Hanin include:
 Florent Hanin (born 1990), French professional footballer
 Leo Hanin (born 1913), Russian Zionist activist
 Roger Hanin (1925–2015), French actor and film director